Something Else is the seventeenth studio album by American band The Brian Jonestown Massacre. It was released in June 2018 under A Recordings.

Track listing

References

2018 albums
The Brian Jonestown Massacre albums